Galvan London is a British contemporary fashion brand designed by four international women.

History 
German designer Anna-Christin Haas; American businesswoman Katherine Holmgren (who serves as CEO); Icelandic former model Sólveig "Sola" Harrison (who serves as creative director); and Swiss businesswoman Carolyn Hodler (who serves as sales director), established the Galvan brand together in 2014, after frustration with not being able to find the right wedding or event attire for young women below the unattainable high fashion price ranges. Although none of them are of British nationality, they decided to base the operations  in London, England whilst working virtually. The textiles of their pieces come from Italy and France, and their showroom is in Düsseldorf, Germany.  Galvan is primarily sold at Bergdorf Goodman and Neiman Marcus in brick-and-mortar retail.

In popular culture 
Galvan is often noted to be worn by celebrities on the red carpet, including actress Sophie Turner at the 88th Academy Awards. Actresses including Gwyneth Paltrow, Jennifer Lawrence, and Selena Gomez have worn outfits multiple times which had given a radar to the brand in its nascence. German model Heidi Klum wore a Galvan "Pandora" gown, which is considered the brand's signature style, on her wedding day.

References 

2014 establishments in the United Kingdom
Clothing brands of the United Kingdom
2010s fashion
British women fashion designers